Lee Andrew Carseldine (born 17 November 1975) is a retired professional Australian cricketer.

Education
Carseldine has a Masters in Applied Finance from the Queensland University of Technology.

Sporting career
Carseldine played 132 matches for the Queensland Bulls in all formats, with 2298 runs from 47 first-class games and 1529 runs from 59 one-day games.

Carseldine's back stress fractures and degenerative disc problems forced him into retirement in 2004 after 24 first class games. He made a comeback in November 2007, playing for the Bulls in Sheffield Shield, FR Cup, and Twenty20 matches. He also earned a spot in the Rajasthan Royals Indian Premier League side.

Carseldine retired from first class cricket in 2011 and continued to freelance himself in the T20 format which saw him play in the Bangladesh Premier League and KFC Big Bash until 2012. Upon retirement he joined the Australian Cricketers Association as a Past Player Welfare and Game Development Manager.

Media career
Carseldine regularly contributed to ABC Grandstand and Fox Sports as a sports commentator, whilst employed by the Australian Cricketers' Association.

In June 2014 Carseldine joined Sunshine Coast radio station Hot 91 as a presenter of The Big Brekky, alongside Daniel O'Carroll, Lynda Edmonds and Ash Gierke. However, Carseldine resigned just six weeks after joining Hot 91, citing personal reasons.  Hot 91 station manager Troy Deighton wished Carseldine well, saying he understood and respected his decision to leave the station. In 2015, Carseldine launched Droneit Group, an aerial film and photography company.

In 2016, he appeared as a contestant on season 3 of Australian Survivor. He ended up as the season's runner-up.

Carseldine appeared on the January 2017 issue of Australian Men's Health magazine.

In 2020, he returned to play on Australian Survivor: All Stars. He made it deep into the season again, only to voluntarily leave the game upon news of his mother's stroke.

Personal life
Carseldine has two sons with his ex-wife, Tanya. He and fellow Australian Survivor contestant Elena Rowland began a relationship when their series ended. In February 2019, the couple broke up.

References

External links

 Cricketer Lee Carseldine's back pain fixed by killer bug, The Courier-Mail, 2008
 Lee Carseldine's comeback journey from third grade to IPL is truly inspiring, Fox Sports, 2009

Queensland cricketers
Australian cricketers
Living people
1975 births
People from Nambour, Queensland
Cricketers from Queensland
Rajasthan Royals cricketers
Queensland University of Technology alumni
Australian Survivor contestants